SS Group A may refer to any of the following automobiles marketed by Holden in Australia.

 Holden VK Commodore SS Group A
 Holden VL Commodore SS Group A
 Holden VL Commodore SS Group A SV
 Holden VN Commodore SS Group A SV